Götz Spielmann (born 11 January 1961) is an Austrian director and scriptwriter.

Life and career
Spielmann was born in Wels, Austria, and grew up in Vienna. After High School, he lived in Paris for several months. From 1980 to 1987 he studied film direction and script-writing in Vienna at the University of Music and Performing Arts, Vienna. At the Viennese Filmacadamy, his professors included Harald Zusanek and Axel Corti.

After making several short films, and receiving his diploma with Vergiss Sneider!, with the drama Erwin und Julia,  Spielmann had his first great success. In 1993, his film Der Nachbar won the Vienna Filmaward at the Viennale. And in 1994, his film for television Dieses naive Verlangen was awarded with the Erich-Neuberg-Preis.  In 2006, he was honored with the Upper Austrian Landeskulturpreis in the  “Film” section.

Spielmann is one of the most important contemporary Austrian film directors. His films The Stranger and Antares were the Austrian candidates for Oscar nomination for Best Foreign Language Film. Antares has been screened widely at more than thirty International Film Festivals.

Spielmann is on the committee of the Verband der Filmregisseure Österreichs (the Association of the Austrian film directors).

In the Linzer Kammerspiele (Linz, Upper Austria) he made his debut as theatre director with the performance of the play Der einsame Weg, written by Arthur Schnitzler. For the season 2006/2007, he wrote his first play for the theatre, the Landestheater Linz, Imperium, which was first released on 5 January 2007 at the Linzer Kammerspiele.

In January 2009 Spielmann's Revanche was nominated for an Academy Award for Best Foreign Language Film.

Films (selection) 
 Erwin und Julia (1990)
 Der Nachbar (1993)
 Dieses naive Verlangen (1993)
 Loveable Lies (Liebe Lügen; aka Pretty Lies) (1995)
 Fear of the Idyll (Die Angst vor der Idylle) (1996)
 The Stranger (Die Fremde) (2000)
 Spiel im Morgengrauen  (2001)
 Antares (2004)
 Revanche (2008)
 October November (2013)

External links

1961 births
Austrian film directors
20th-century Austrian dramatists and playwrights
21st-century Austrian dramatists and playwrights
Austrian male dramatists and playwrights
Austrian screenwriters
English-language film directors
German-language film directors
Living people
Austrian male screenwriters